The 1959–60 Drexel Dragons men's basketball team represented Drexel Institute of Technology during the 1959–60 men's basketball season. The Dragons, led by 8th year head coach Samuel Cozen, played their home games at Sayre High School and were members of the College–Southern division of the Middle Atlantic Conferences (MAC).

The team finished the season 12–7, and finished in 1st place in the MAC in the regular season.

Roster

Schedule

|-
!colspan=9 style="background:#F8B800; color:#002663;"| Regular season
|-

|-
!colspan=9 style="background:#F8B800; color:#002663;"| 1960 Middle Atlantic Conference men's basketball tournament

|-
!colspan=9 style="background:#F8B800; color:#002663;"| 1960 NCAA College Division basketball tournament

Awards
Robert Morgan
All-District Small College Team

References

Drexel Dragons men's basketball seasons
Drexel
1959 in sports in Pennsylvania
1960 in sports in Pennsylvania